In Greek mythology, Messeis was one of the Inachides nymphs and sister of Amymone, Io and Hyperia. She was the naiad nymph of a spring and was related to the town Argos in Peloponnese.

Note

References 

 Gaius Valerius Flaccus, Argonautica translated by Mozley, J H. Loeb Classical Library Volume 286. Cambridge, MA, Harvard University Press; London, William Heinemann Ltd. 1928. Online version at theio.com.
 Gaius Valerius Flaccus, Argonauticon. Otto Kramer. Leipzig. Teubner. 1913. Latin text available at the Perseus Digital Library.

Naiads
Nymphs
Argive characters in Greek mythology
Mythology of Argolis